Cumberland Grove Country Club formerly known as Orange Grove Golf Club from 1962 till 1990, then known as Grove Golf Club from 1991 until January 1998, is located on the Cumberland Highway (Orange Grove Road) in Liverpool, New South Wales and is the new home to the Rale Rasic International Football Academy.

Orange Grove Golf Club
Orange Grove Golf Club began in 1962 through the dissatisfaction of a few golfers over conditions at their club. They sought fresh fields and called a meeting, at which they unanimously voted to buy land and establish their own club. By the mid seventies the club had through mismanagement and theft reached the brink of closing. In 1976 George Jarrett was appointed Secretary Manager. By negotiating with creditors and suppliers Jarrett was able to trade the club out of difficulties and ensure that the golfing public of Liverpool had access to this wonderful facility. During this time once a week was ladies day and the most famous player on these occasions was Margaret Whitlam - wife of the then recently deposed Australian Prime Minister Gough Whitlam.

Cumberland Grove Sporting Educational & Research Institute
On 16 August 2006, former prime minister and former Federal Member for Werriwa, The Honourable Edward Gough Whitlam, AC, QC launched the Cumberland Grove Sporting Educational & Research Institute at the Cumberland Grove Country Club which is to be turned into a $40,000,000 soccer football training complex for the children of Australia. Cumberland Grove became a reality through the efforts of Sydney businessman Edmond M Parilo and the international soccer legend and coach of the 1974 Socceroo's, Rale Rasic OAM Cumberland Grove is now the home of:
Cumberland Grove Country Club
Cumberland Grove Sporting Educational & Research Institute
Cumberland Grove Function Centre
Rale Rasic International Football Academy
The Rale Rasic Goalkeeping Academy
Liverpool United FC
Southern Districts Soccer Football Association Headquarters
The Inaugural Australian Football Museum
Cafe Club 74

The Master of Ceremonies at the launch was Network 10 Reporter/Presenter Frank Coletta and saw 30 children from Southern Districts in their different uniforms playing soccer on the new fields. The launch was highly publicized throughout Australia by Network 10, Nine Network, SBS, the ABC, The Daily Telegraph and the Sydney Morning Herald.

See Cabramatta Golf Club

External links
Cumberland Grove Country Club Website
Rale Rasic Football Academy

Culture of Sydney
Golf clubs and courses in New South Wales
Clubs and societies in Australia
1962 establishments in Australia
Organizations established in 1962